Mapp and Lucia is a British drama television series that was first broadcast on BBC One from 29 to 31 December 2014. The three-part series, adapted by Steve Pemberton and directed by Diarmuid Lawrence, is based on E. F. Benson's Mapp and Lucia collection of novels. The series features an  ensemble cast, with British actresses Miranda Richardson and Anna Chancellor playing the eponymous characters Elizabeth Mapp and Emmeline 'Lucia' Lucas.  It is set in the Sussex coastal town of Tilling, based very closely on Rye, East Sussex, where it was filmed and where Benson lived. Although attracting modest viewing figures, the series received positive reviews from critics.

Cast
 Anna Chancellor as Emmeline 'Lucia' Lucas
 Steve Pemberton as Georgie Pillson
 Miranda Richardson as Elizabeth Mapp
 Mark Gatiss as Major Benjy
 Felicity Montagu as Godiva 'Diva' Plaistow
 Gemma Whelan as Irene Coles
 Paul Ritter as Reverend Kenneth Bartlett
 Poppy Miller as Evie Bartlett
 Nick Woodeson as Mr Wyse
 Pippa Haywood as Mrs Wyse
 Katy Brand as Hermione 'Hermy' Pillson
 Joanna Scanlan as Ursula 'Ursy' Pillson
 Frances Barber as Amelia, Contessa di Faraglione 
 Jenny Platt as Foljambe
 Gavin Brocker as Cadman
 Soo Drouet as Grosvenor
 Susan Porrett as Withers
 Harish Patel as Guru/Gupta

Episodes

Production
Mapp and Lucia was commissioned by Charlotte Moore and Ben Stephenson for BBC One. Filming took place in and around Rye during the summer of 2014  as well as Kent and East Sussex Railway Station in Tenterden.

The "guru" storyline in episode 2 is taken from E.F. Benson's first Lucia novel, Queen Lucia (1920), with Daisy Quantock being the guru's original sponsor. Transported to Tilling in this series, Diva Plaistow plays the Daisy role in the storyline.

References

External links
 
 

2014 British television series debuts
2014 British television series endings
2010s British drama television series
British comedy-drama television shows
BBC television dramas
2010s British television miniseries
Television shows based on British novels
Television series set in the 1930s
Television shows set in Sussex
English-language television shows
Mapp and Lucia